Guzzler is a maze video game developed and manufactured by Tehkan and licensed to Centuri for US distribution in 1983. It was released as an arcade conversion kit, including a new marquee and control panel, then ported to the SG-1000 console. In Guzzler, the player controls a creature who can drink (or guzzle) water from puddles, then extinguish fires and monsters spawned from those fires.

Gameplay 
Each level is a maze of varying openness. Colorful fire. that must be extinguished to complete the level, also spawn fire-themed monsters which pursue the player. The main character can attack with three blasts of liquid before becoming empty.  With each blast of liquid, the character moves faster and gets closer to being an empty outline with pink shoes. When empty the character is a shell of a sprite, but moves faster. Liquid is replenished by drinking from puddles.  Occasionally, an alcoholic beverage appears in the center of the screen. Picking it up causes the character to refill and the fires temporarily freeze.

Reception
William Michael Brown wrote in the Electronic Fun with Computers & Games 1983 coin-op preview: "Of all the brand new [conversion] kit titles that we saw, probably the best is Centuri's Guzzler."

References

External links 
 

1983 video games
Arcade video games
Maze games
Nintendo Switch games
PlayStation 4 games
SG-1000 games
Tecmo games
Video games developed in Japan

Hamster Corporation games